Calliostoma semisuave is a species of sea snail, a marine gastropod mollusk in the family Calliostomatidae.

Description
The height of the shell attains 14 mm.

Distribution
This species occurs in the Caribbean Sea from Venezuela to French Guiana at depths between 69 m and 155 m.

References

 Quinn, J. F., Jr. 1992. New species of Calliostoma Swainson, 1840 (Gastropoda: Trochidae), and notes on some poorly known species from the Western Atlantic Ocean. Nautilus 106: 77-114.

External links
 To Biodiversity Heritage Library (1 publication)
 To Encyclopedia of Life
 To USNM Invertebrate Zoology Mollusca Collection
 To World Register of Marine Species

semisuave
Gastropods described in 1992